Lukas Stephan Horst Daschner (born 1 October 1998) is a German professional footballer who plays as a midfielder for  club FC St. Pauli.

Career
Daschner signed his first professional contract with MSV Duisburg in April 2017. He made his 3. Liga debut for the club on 20 May against FSV Zwickau. On 17 August 2019, he extended his contract until 2021. In the 2019–20 season he scored 11 goals and made 5 assists in 34 3. Liga matches.

In August 2020, Daschner joined 2. Bundesliga side FC St. Pauli having agreed a contract until 2023. The transfer fee paid to MSV Duisburg was undisclosed.

Career statistics

Honours
MSV Duisburg
 3. Liga: 2016–17

References

External links

1998 births
Living people
Footballers from Duisburg
German footballers
Association football midfielders
MSV Duisburg players
FC St. Pauli players
2. Bundesliga players
3. Liga players
Regionalliga players
FC St. Pauli II players